Antons Justs (22 November 1931 – 17 February 2019) was a Latvian Roman Catholic bishop.

Justs was born in Latvia and was ordained to the priesthood in 1960.  After serving in Virginia in the U.S.,  he served as bishop of the Roman Catholic Diocese of Jelgava, Latvia, from 1996 to 2011.

Notes

1931 births
2019 deaths
Latvian Roman Catholic bishops